The 1941 Sa'dah earthquake or the Jabal Razih earthquake occurred on January 11 in the Razih District of Yemen. The earthquake had a surface wave magnitude of 5.8–6.5 and a shallow focal depth. Despite the moderate size of this earthquake, an estimated 1,200 people perished and at least 200 injured. With a maximum MSK-64 intensity assigned at VIII, it destroyed many villages and collapsed homes in the region of North Yemen.

Tectonic setting
Western Yemen is located near the southwestern point of the Arabian Plate. At this location lies the Afar Triple Junction, where it meets the Nubian and Somali plates at three divergent boundaries. The three plates are rifting apart; extensional tectonics stretch the plates and eventually form new oceanic crust, in the case of the Gulf of Aden and the Red Sea, where active rifting is ongoing. The extension causes normal faulting to break within the crust and cause earthquakes.

The most recent major seismic activity related to the regional tectonics were a series of six magnitude 6.0+ earthquakes in Djibouti and Ethiopia in 1989. The largest shock had a moment magnitude of 6.5 and resulted in two deaths.

Foreshocks
The earthquake was preceded by slight foreshocks that began days before the mainshock struck. A damaging foreshock occurred at noon on January 9, causing destruction in Al Hudaydah.

Damage
The mainshock occurred at mid-day with an estimated surface-wave magnitude of between 5.8 and 6.2 while some estimates suggests it was up to  6.5. This strong earthquake was felt in the Al Darb governorate of neighboring Saudi Arabia and as far as Assab in present-day Eritrea, then part of Ethiopia.
In all, a total of 1,200 people were killed and some 1,700 homes were lost. Another 400 homes suffered damage so serious, they had to be demolished.

Aftershocks
Many aftershocks were felt every day up until the second week of March. These aftershocks worsened the damage caused by the mainshock. Two large aftershocks occurred at 09:18 on 4 February and at 19:03 on 23 February. The first aftershock had a magnitude of 5.2 and was reported from Haidan, Khaulan, al-Zahir, and Wadi al-'Abidin near Sa'da, causing landslides. Damage was also reported from Abu Arish and Sabiya to the northwest and Harad to the southwest. The second aftershock of 23 February was reported from al-Hudaida, Bait al-Faqih, al-Sa'id, and Bura, and caused significant damage.

See also
1982 North Yemen earthquake
List of earthquakes in 1941
List of earthquakes in Yemen
List of earthquakes in Saudi Arabia

References

External links

1941 earthquakes
Earthquakes in Yemen
Earthquakes in Saudi Arabia
January 1941 events
1941 disasters in Asia